Udayadeb is a small town in Baitadi District in the Mahakali Zone of western Nepal. At the time of the 1991 Nepal census it had a population of 3,547 and had 561 houses in the town.

References

Populated places in Baitadi District
Village development committees (Nepal)